Gavin McGowan (born 16 January 1976 in Blackheath, England) is an English retired professional  footballer who played as a defender. McGowan featured for Arsenal in the Premier League and for Luton Town in the Football League Second Division.

Career
McGowan joined Arsenal's youth team in 1992 at the age of 16. In 1994, he won the FA Youth Cup with Arsenal when they beat Millwall 5–3 in the final. He only played one game against Crystal Palace as Arsenal won the 1997-98 FA Premier League, meaning he did not qualify for a winners' medal.
In all McGowan made seven appearances for Arsenal with six caps coming in the Premier League, and one in the FA Cup for the London side.

Unable to win a first-team place at Arsenal, McGowan moved to Luton Town in the summer of 1998, having already spent two periods on loan there. McGowan was initially a first-team player but an injury during the 1999–2000 season limited his appearances. He left the club on a free transfer in 2002 after a clearout by then recently employed manager Joe Kinnear.

Personal life
After retiring from Football, McGowan attended Greenwich University where he studied as a PE Teacher passing with BA Honours. McGowan joined Orchard Park High School in 2007 in the borough of Croydon. He was Head of Football at King's College School in Wimbledon. McGowan is a qualified UEFA B coach. He is now head of PE at Ravensbourne school in Bromley.

Honours
Arsenal
FA Youth Cup: 1994

References

1976 births
Living people
English footballers
Footballers from Blackheath, London
Association football defenders
Arsenal F.C. players
Luton Town F.C. players
Premier League players
Redhill F.C. players